El Helicoide is a building in Caracas, Venezuela owned by the Venezuelan government and used as a facility and prison for both regular and political prisoners of the Bolivarian National Intelligence Service (SEBIN). In the shape of a three-sided pyramid, it was originally constructed as a shopping mall, but never completed.

During the Nicolás Maduro administration, El Helicoide became a high-profile prison for political detainees where systemic torture and human rights violations have taken place. Prisoners have reported "people being beaten, electrocuted, hung by their limbs, forced into stress positions and forced to plunge their face into a bag of faeces and breathe in".

History 
El Helicoide is built on a hill in Roca Tarpeya between the parishes of San Pedro and San Agustín, in the extension of the avenues Armed Forces, President Medina Angarita, and Nueva Granada. It has the shape of a three-sided pyramid with curved points formed by elevated paved roads intended for vehicle traffic and parking around an enclosed central area.

Concept 
Its construction was undertaken by a private company during the government of then-president Marcos Pérez Jiménez in 1956. It was designed by the architects Pedro Neuberger, Dirk Bornhorst and Jorge Romero Gutiérrez. The project was to have included 300 boutiques, eight cinemas, a heliport, a 5-star hotel, a park, a club of owners and a show palace on the seventh level. The building would include a 4 km long ramp spiraling around the structure itself, allowing vehicles to enter the building and park inside. The project would have cost $10 million in 1958, or $90 million in 2018.

In preparation for the project, many families were evicted from shanty towns in San Agustín and had their homes demolished.

Cancellation 
Following the 1958 Venezuelan coup d'état which resulted in the overthrow of dictator Marcos Pérez Jiménez, developers were accused of being funded by Pérez Jiménez's government. The incoming government refused to allow the mall's construction and litigation surrounding the project began involving the developers, businesses and the government. Nelson Rockefeller made offers to take over the project, but regulations resulted in the withdrawal of his proposal. By 1961, construction of the building came to a halt after the development firm fell into bankruptcy one year before completion. That same year the project was exhibited at the Museum of Modern Art in New York City.

In 1965 attempts were made to resume its construction to complete it by 1967, though plans fell through. Over time, only the concrete foundation of the project was present while equipment destined for the cancelled mall was stolen, including custom high-speed Austrian elevators.

Government facility 

In 1975, the Venezuelan government acquired the facility. Between 1979 and 1982, 10,000 squatters occupied the facility until they were evicted. By 1982, only the geodesic dome with its aluminum top on the concrete infrastructure was completed.

From 1984, some state agencies were gradually installed in the building, the most important of which was the Directorate of Intelligence and Prevention Services (DISIP). In 1985, DISIP purchased a 15 year lease for the lower two floors of El Helicoide, where prison cells are presently located. The building was seriously affected by a bombing in the 1992 Venezuelan coup d'état attempts and an anti-aircraft response from it. The dome was later repaired following these events. 

Since 2010, part of the building serves as the headquarters of the National Experimental Security University (UNES). As unrest grew surrounding the Nicolás Maduro government, offices, storerooms and even lavatories were converted into makeshift holding areas for the growing number of prisoners. Prisoners describe it as a place where systematic torture and human rights violations occur. 

Dimensions

 Total area: 101,940 m²
 Built area: 77,748 m²
 Commercial premises: 46,715 m²
 Roads and green areas: 29,192 m²
 Exhibition and industry area: 8.445 m²

See also

 Gulag
 Laogai
 Kwalliso
 La Tumba (Caracas)

References

External links 

 Video of torture at El Helicoide, from ABC Spain

Buildings and structures in Caracas
Government buildings completed in 1961
Office buildings completed in 1961
Office buildings in Venezuela
Prisons in Venezuela
Pyramids in South America
Torture in Venezuela
Intelligence agency headquarters
Police headquarters
Squats
Former squats